This is a list of English football seasons played by Devonshire Park (1881 until 1889), Eastbourne (1889 until 1971) and Eastbourne Town Football Club from 1971 to the present day. Their early years (1881-1905) were spent playing in friendly and cup games. It wasn't until 1898 when Eastbourne competed in the FA Cup and FA Amateur Cup.
Eastbourne joined the South Eastern League in 1905, replacing Eastbourne Swifts, the league agreed for Eastbourne to continue playing in their place. In 1907 Eastbourne were founder members of the Southern Amateur Football League and played between 1907 and 1946, winning the league on two occasions. Eastbourne were also founder members of the Sussex County League in 1920 playing just one season along side the Southern Amateur league. Eastbourne left for the Corinthian League from 1946 until it merged with the Athenian League in 1963, playing in Divisions One and Two.
In 1976, Eastbourne Town re-joined the Sussex County League playing in Divisions One and Two until promotion into the Isthmian Football League in 2007 before being relegated into back into the Sussex County League in 2015.
In 2015, the Sussex County Football League was renamed into the Southern Combination Football League, the divisions being renamed into Premier and Division One.

Key

Key to colours and symbols:

Key to divisions
 SE1 = South Eastern League Division 1
 SE2 = South Eastern League Division 2
 SA1 = Southern Amateur League Division 1
 SA2 = Southern Amateur League Division 2
 SAA = Southern Amateur League Section A 
 SAB = Southern Amateur League Section B 
 COR = Corinthian League
 AL1 = Athenian League Division One
 AL2 = Athenian League Division Two
 IL1 = Isthmian Division One South
 SCP = South Combination Premier Division
 SC1 = Sussex County League Division One
 SC2 = Sussex County League Division Two

Key to league record
 P = Games played
 W = Games won
 D = Games drawn
 L = Games lost
 F = Goals for
 A = Goals against
 Pts = Points
 Pos = Final position

Key to rounds
 EP = Extra Prelimninary round
 PR = Preliminary round
 1Q = First qualifying round
 2Q = Second qualifying round, etc.
 1R = First round
 2R = Second round, etc.
 QF = Quarter-finals
 SF = Semi-finals

Seasons

1881–1900
In this period, Devonshire Park and Eastbourne F.C. only competed in friendly games and later in the Sussex Senior Cup.

1900–1920
In this period, Eastbourne only played in cup games before joining the Amateur Football League and the Southern Amateur League in 1907

1920–1946
In this period, Eastbourne remained in the Southern Amateur League, but also joined the Sussex County League as a founding member, playing in two leagues for just one season.

1946–1960

In this period, Eastbourne left the Southern Amateur League and joined the Corinthian League.

1960–1980
In this period, Eastbourne left the Corinthian League and joined the Athenian League, later renamed to Eastbourne Town and joined the Sussex County League.

1980–2000
In this period, Eastbourne Town played in the Sussex County League.

2000–2020
In this period, Eastbourne Town were promoted into the Isthmian League and played in the FA Trophy for the first time.

2020–

Notes

Sources for League, FA Cup, FA Trophy and FA Vase statistics:

References

Seasons
Eastbourne Town